The 2013 Festival of World Cups was a series of rugby league World Cups held in the United Kingdom during 2013. The centrepiece of the Festival was the men's 2013 Rugby League World Cup. In addition to this tournament, there were also world cups held for students, police, women, armed forces and wheelchair teams.

Festival schedule
The Festival of World Cups includes:

University

The eighth Student Rugby League World Cup were held in July. The eight countries that took part were England, Australia, Ireland, New Zealand, Russia, South Africa, Scotland and Wales.

Group stage games took place at South Leeds Stadium, The Big Fellas Stadium in Featherstone, The LoveRugbyLeague.Com Stadium in Batley and The Tetley’s Stadium in Dewsbury.

Men

The fourteenth Rugby League World Cup took place with the final on 30 November. Fourteen teams took part. Defending Champions New Zealand, hosts England, Australia, France, Wales, Ireland, Scotland, Fiji, Samoa, the Cook Islands and Papua New Guinea all qualified automatically, while Italy and the United States qualified through tournaments in 2010 and 2011. The final was held at Old Trafford on 30 November.

Police

The second Police Rugby League World Cup took place in July. Defending champions Fiji joined hosts Great Britain and  Australia in the tournament.

Group stage games took place at South Leeds Stadium, The Big Fellas Stadium in Featherstone, The LoveRugbyLeague.Com Stadium in Batley and The Tetley’s Stadium in Dewsbury.

Women

The fourth Women's Rugby League World Cup were held in Leeds alongside the student and police World Cups, with the final taking place at Headingley Rugby Stadium, Leeds. Seven teams took part including three time defending champions New Zealand as well as hosts England and Australia, France, Russia, Samoa and Tonga. 

Group stage games took place at South Leeds Stadium, The Big Fellas Stadium in Featherstone, The LoveRugbyLeague.Com Stadium in Batley and The Tetley’s Stadium in Dewsbury.

Armed Forces

The second Armed Forces World Cup took place at the Colchester Garrison Sports Stadium. Five nations competed; Great Britain, Australia, New Zealand, Russia and Serbia. The middle weekend of the tournament coincides with the annual military festival held in Colchester.

Wheelchair

Six teams took part in the second Wheelchair Rugby League World Cup which was held at Medway Park. The six teams were France, Australia, England, Scotland, Ireland and Wales.

References

External links
Official site

Festival of World Cups